The Hampstead by-election was a Parliamentary by-election held on 24 January 1902. The constituency returned one Member of Parliament (MP) to the House of Commons of the United Kingdom, elected by the first past the post voting system.

Electoral history
The seat had been Conservative since it was created in 1885.

Result

Aftermath

References

Hampstead by-election
Hampstead by-election
Hampstead,1902
Hampstead,1902